Ese Ejja (Ese'eha, Eseʼexa, Ese exa), also known as Tiatinagua (Tatinawa), is a Tacanan language of Bolivia and Peru. It is spoken by Ese Ejja people of all ages.  Dialects are Guacanawa (Guarayo/Huarayo), Baguaja, Echoja, and possibly extinct Chama, Chuncho, Huanayo, Kinaki, and Mohino. Chunene is "similar" to Ese Ejja, though whether a dialect or a separate language is not clear.

Historical, social and cultural characteristics 
Ese Ejja is spoken in the La Paz, Beni, and Pando departments of Bolivia (in the provinces of Iturralde, Ballivián, Vaca Diez, and Madre de Dios) on the Beni and Madre de Dios rivers; and in the Madre de Dios and Puno departments of Peru. According to Alexiades & Peluso (2009), there are approximately 1,500 Ese Ejja, distributed among different communities in Peru and Bolivia. The Bolivian Ese Ejja are divided into two clans: the Quijati, around the Riberalta region; and the Hepahuatahe in the Rurenabaque region. Crevels & Muysken (2009:15) write that in Bolivia there were 518 Ese Ejja speakers (of four years of age and older), and therefore is an endangered language. Some names used to refer to the language are Ese'eha, Chama, and Warayo; Chama is a pejorative regional name, and Guarayo is also the name of a Tupí-Guaraní language. In Peru the Ese Ejja language (Guacanahua, Echoja, Chuncho) is spoken along the Madre de Dios and Tambopata rivers and at their sources in three locations: Sonene, Palma Real, and Infierno. Ese Ejja is also seriously threatened in Peru, with 840 speakers in an ethnic group of the same size.

Grammatical features

Notes

Bibliography

External links 

 ELAR archive of Documentation of the Ese Ejja language of the Amazonian region of Bolivia
Ese Ejja (Intercontinental Dictionary Series)
Ese Ejja (Huarayo) (Intercontinental Dictionary Series)

Tacanan languages
Languages of Bolivia
Languages of Peru